Get You may refer to:

"Get You" (Alexey Vorobyov song)
"Get You" (Daniel Caesar song), featuring Kali Uchis
"Get You", Shawn Austin song from the 2022 extended play Planes Don't Wait